Vecrīga ("Old Riga") is the historical center and a neighbourhood (as Vecpilsēta) of Riga, Latvia, located in the Central District on the east side of Daugava River. Vecrīga is famous for its old churches and cathedrals, such as Riga Cathedral and St. Peter's Church.

History 

Vecrīga is the original area of Riga and consists of the historic city limits before the city was greatly expanded in the late 19th century.  Vecrīga was once protected by a surrounding wall, except the side adjacent to the Daugava river bank. When the wall was demolished, the waters from Daugava were diverted into area of the former wall, creating Riga City Canal.

Heritage 

In the early 1990s, Vecrīga's streets were closed to traffic and only residents of the area and the local delivery vehicles were allowed within Vecrīga's limits with special permits. Vecrīga is part of a UNESCO World Heritage Site listed as "Historic Centre of Riga", which also includes most of the surrounding Centrs district.

Vecrīga is the oldest part of the Riga, and — even though in its primordial state most of the buildings were made of wood — currently, there are a lot of architectural works remaining from the times of renaissance, baroque and medieval times in the middle of the unique and notable buildings in the style of Art Nouveau, especially the ones created by the locally and internationally well-known architect Mikhail Eisenstein.

Landmarks

Churches 

 Church of St. Peter     
 The Dome Cathedral     
 Cathedral of Saint James     
 Church of Saint John     
 Church of Our Lady of Sorrows
 Anglican Church          
 Reformed Church     
 Church of Mary Magdalene

Museums 

 Military Museum
 Museum of the History of Riga and Navigation
 Sports Museum
 Latvian Museum of Pharmacy
 Latvian Museum of Photography
 Riga castle
 Latvian Museum of National History
 Art Museum Riga Bourse
 Museum of Decorative and Applied Arts
 Museum of the Occupation of Latvia
 Latvian Museum of Architecture
 Riga Film Museum

Gallery

See also
 Triangula Bastion

References

External links

Multimedia virtual tour of Old Riga

Neighbourhoods in Riga
World Heritage Sites in Latvia